Bruno Volpi (born 23 June 1993) is an Argentine professional footballer who plays as a forward for Honduran club Marathón.

Early life
Volpi was born in the city of Quilmes in Greater Buenos Aires.

Club career

Ituzaingó
Volpi began playing for Primera D Metropolitana side Ituzaingó in 2015. In his first three seasons, he scored fifteen goals in 55 appearances and won the league championship in 2016–17. The following season, the club played in the Primera C Metropolitana, where he scored six goals in 34 appearances.

San Miguel
In 2018, Volpi signed with Primera B Metropolitana side San Miguel, and scored one goal in 25 appearances that season.

Platense
In 2019, Volpi signed with Honduran Liga Nacional side Platense, scoring seven goals in seventeen appearances in the Apertura season that year.

Marathón
Ahead of the 2020 Clausura season in Honduras, Volpi switched to Marathón. He made thirteen appearances that season, scoring four goals. The following season, he made his continental debut in CONCACAF League.

Career statistics

References

External links

1993 births
Living people
Association football forwards
Argentine footballers
People from Quilmes
Argentine expatriate footballers
Expatriate footballers in Honduras
Argentine expatriate sportspeople in Honduras
Club Atlético Ituzaingó players
Club Atlético San Miguel footballers
Platense F.C. players
C.D. Marathón players
Primera D Metropolitana players
Primera C Metropolitana players
Primera B Metropolitana players
Liga Nacional de Fútbol Profesional de Honduras players
Sportspeople from Buenos Aires Province